Samuel Thomson (14 February 1862 – 23 December 1943) was a Scottish footballer. A Scotland international, he was a member of the Preston North End side which became known as "The Invincibles".

Career
Thomson was born at Lugar, Scotland on 14 February 1862. His first club was Lugar Boswell, and while with them he was twice picked to play for Scotland – the only serving Lugar player to have been selected for international duty. He later had a short spell with Rangers, before becoming one of the many Scottish-born footballers who joined Preston North End as the Lancashire club assembled a side that was almost unbeatable.

Thomson signed for Preston North End in 1888. Playing as a winger, he made his League debut on 15 September 1888 at Dudley Road, the then home of  Wolverhampton Wanderers. Preston defeated the home team 4–0. Thomson scored his debut League goal on 12 November 1888, at Victoria Ground, the then home of Stoke. Thomson scored the third goal as Preston North End defeated the home team 3–0. He appeared in 16 of the 22 League matches played by Preston North End during the 1888–89 season and scored three goals. It was Thomson's performances in the club's run to the 1889 FA Cup Final that endeared him to Preston fans, and he earned himself a winner's medal as Preston North End beat Wolverhampton Wanderers 3–0; he scored one of the three goals.

He was an important member of the side that retained the title in season 1889–90 but in the close season he was persuaded to join Wolverhampton Wanderers without the Deepdale club's permission. The incident went before the Committee and Wolves were fined £50 for their misconduct. Having joined Wolves, he scored nine goals in 24 League and FA Cup matches and he then moved to Everton. After a handful of games for Everton he was on the move again, this time to Accrington where he ended his playing days. He later became a railway clerk based in Preston. He died aged 81 on 23 December 1943.

References

External links 

Rangers F.C. players
Preston North End F.C. players
Wolverhampton Wanderers F.C. players
Everton F.C. players
Scottish footballers
Scotland international footballers
1862 births
1943 deaths
Footballers from East Ayrshire
Lugar Boswell Thistle F.C. players
Accrington F.C. players
English Football League players
Association football forwards
Place of death missing
FA Cup Final players